Allantoicase is an enzyme that in humans is encoded by the ALLC gene. Allantoicase  catalyzes the chemical reaction

allantoate + H2O  (S)-ureidoglycolate + urea

Thus, the two substrates of this enzyme are allantoate and H2O, whereas its two products are (S)-ureidoglycolate and urea.

This enzyme belongs to the family of hydrolases, those acting on carbon-nitrogen bonds other than peptide bonds, specifically in linear amidines.  The systematic name of this enzyme class is allantoate amidinohydrolase. This enzyme participates in purine metabolism by facilitating the utilization of purines as secondary nitrogen sources under nitrogen-limiting conditions. While purine degradation converges to uric acid in all vertebrates, its further degradation varies from species to species. Uric acid is excreted by birds, reptiles, and some mammals that do not have a functional uricase gene, whereas other mammals produce allantoin. Amphibians and microorganisms produce ammonia and carbon dioxide using the uricolytic pathway. Allantoicase performs the second step in this pathway catalyzing the conversion of allantoate into ureidoglycolate and urea.

Structural studies

The structure of allantoicase is best described as being composed of two repeats (the allantoicase repeats: AR1 and AR2), which are connected by a flexible linker. The crystal structure, resolved at 2.4A resolution, reveals that AR1 has a very similar fold to AR2, both repeats being jelly-roll motifs, composed of four-stranded and five-stranded antiparallel beta-sheets. Each jelly-roll motif has two conserved surface patches that probably constitute the active site.

References

Further reading 
 
 
 
 

EC 3.5.3
Enzymes of known structure